Anatoliy Anatoliyovych Herey (born 31 March 1989) is a Ukrainian épée fencer, team silver medallist in the 2013 World Fencing Championships.

Career
Herey comes from a fencing family: his father and uncle were honoured masters of sports for the USSR and became fencing coaches; his cousin Yulianna is a foil fencer. His first international distinction was a bronze medal at the 2008 U23 European Championships 2008 in Monza. A year later he won a silver medal both in the individual and team events of the Junior World Championships in Belfast in what was hailed as a renaissance for Ukrainian épée fencing.

Herey began fencing in the senior category in the 2009–10 season, earning a bronze medal in the 2010 Buenos Aires World Cup. He joined the Ukraine national team in the 2010–11 season and took part in the European Championships in Sheffield. Ukraine was defeated by France in the semi-finals, then by Russia, and finished fourth. Herey also participated in the 2011 World Championships in Catania. He defeated Switzerland's Benjamin Steffen in the first round, then ceded to Italy's Paolo Pizzo, who would eventually win the competition.

In the 2012 European Championships at Legnano Ukraine fell against Hungary, but overcame France in the small final to take the bronze medal. The scenario was repeated in the 2013 edition at Zagreb. At the World Championships in Budapest Herey lost in the first round to Italy's Enrico Garozzo. In the team event Ukraine edged past Russia in the table of 16, Herey suffering a 10–5 loss against Pavel Sukhov. then defeated the Czech Republic and France to meet Hungary in the final. They were overcome 42–38 and took a silver medal, the best result in Ukrainian history for men's épée.

In the 2013–14 season Herey won the Oslo satellite tournament beating Tor Forsse in the final and reached the quarter-finals in the Legnano Grand Prix. He was stopped by Russia's Anton Avdeev in the table of 16 of the European Championships in Strasbourg. In the team event, Ukraine were edged out by Switzerland in the semi-finals, then lost to Russia to take the fourth place. In the World Championships Herey ceded in the second round to Korea's Park Sang-young. In the team event, Ukraine lost in the quarter-finals to South Korea, which eventually took the silver medal. Herey finished the season No.35 in World rankings, a personal best as of 2014.

Herey was educated at the National University of Physical Education and Sport of Ukraine in Kyiv. He used to play the bass guitar in a band, but his father feared he would spread himself too thin and asked him to choose between fencing and music.

References

External links

 
  (archive)
 
 
 

1989 births
Living people
Ukrainian male épée fencers
Sportspeople from Uzhhorod
Olympic fencers of Ukraine
Fencers at the 2016 Summer Olympics
Universiade medalists in fencing
Universiade bronze medalists for Ukraine
Medalists at the 2009 Summer Universiade
Medalists at the 2011 Summer Universiade
Fencers at the 2020 Summer Olympics